Justice Levine may refer to:

Beryl J. Levine, associate justice of the North Dakota Supreme Court
Howard A. Levine, associate justice of the New York Court of Appeals
Irving A. Levine, associate justice of the Maryland Court of Appeals
Isadore Levine, associate justice of the Supreme Court of Indiana

See also
Charles Levin (judge), associate justice of the Michigan Supreme Court
Judge Levin (disambiguation)